Berga is a locality situated in Högsby Municipality, Kalmar County, Sweden with 724 inhabitants in 2010.

References

External links

Populated places in Kalmar County
Populated places in Högsby Municipality